Dactyloscopus byersi, the notchtail stargazer, is a species of sand stargazer native to the Pacific coast of Mexico to Panama where it can be found at depths of from .  It can reach a maximum length of  NG. The specific name honours Major and Mrs. Joseph Byers, about whom no other information is available, since the name honours two people it should be Dactyloscopus byersorum.

References

byersi
Fish described in 1969
Fish of Mexican Pacific coast
Fish of Panama
Taxa named by Charles Eric Dawson